"I Dream to Sleep" is a song by Scottish pop band H2O, composed by all of the band members and produced by Tony Cox. Initially released in 1983, the song was later included on H2O's debut studio album, Faith (1984). The single features the non-album track, "Burn to Win" as its B-side, which was later included as a bonus track on the CD reissue of the Faith album. It was their first release on the label RCA and it peaked at No. 17 on the UK Singles Chart.

Lead singer Ian Donaldson was inspired to write the song's lyrics after seeing Yazoo perform "Only You" on Top of the Pops. It makes reference to and quotes David Bowie's song "Young Americans", of whom Donaldson was a fan.

Track listing
 12" maxi
"I Dream to Sleep" – 5:21
"I Dream to Sleep" (Short Version) – 3:51
"Burn to Win" – 3:34
"I Dream to Sleep" (Engineer's Mix) – 3:47

 7" single
"I Dream to Sleep" – 3:51
"Burn to Win" – 3:34

Chart performance

References

External links
 

1983 singles
RCA Records singles
H2O (Scottish band) songs
1983 songs